Vampire: The Masquerade is a tabletop role-playing game (tabletop RPG) created by Mark Rein-Hagen and released in 1991 by White Wolf Publishing as the first of several Storyteller System games for its World of Darkness setting line. It is set in a fictionalized "gothic-punk" version of the modern world where players assume the role of vampires, who are referred to as "Kindred." and deal with their night-to-night struggles against their own bestial natures, vampire hunters, and each other.

Several associated products were produced based on Vampire: The Masquerade, including live-action role-playing games (Mind's Eye Theatre), dice, collectible card games (The Eternal Struggle), video games (Redemption, Bloodlines, Swansong and Bloodlines 2, Bloodhunt), and numerous novels. In 1996, a short-lived television show loosely based on the game, Kindred: The Embraced, was produced by Aaron Spelling for the Fox Broadcasting Company.

Development
Vampire was inspired by role-playing games (RPGs) such as Call of Cthulhu, RuneQuest, and Nightlife, as well as the writings of Joseph Campbell and vampire films such as The Lost Boys. Rein-Hagen felt that hunting vampires, as a game premise, would get boring, so he came up with the idea of a game wherein the players played vampires instead of hunting them. Rein-Hagen stated that he purposefully did not read Anne Rice's Vampire Chronicles until "very late" in the development process but admitted she was probably an influence on the vampire films that inspired the game. He wanted to go beyond what Anne Rice had done by creating individual vampires, with a whole secret vampire society and culture.

Some of Vampires central themes of the power of belief developed out of Rein-Hagen's religious upbringing. Inspired by a comic book given to him by White Wolf business partner Stewart Wieck, Rein-Hagen developed the idea that the cursed character of the Biblical Cain was the original vampire. In an "Ask Me Anything" interview on Reddit Rein-Hagen referred to the idea of Cain as the progenitor of all vampires as a "big turning point." He commented further: "I was trying to shy away from religion. After that... I went all in. The game and the world became about religion and belief. My father was a Lutheran minister, and I think that played a huge role in not only Vampire but the whole WoD series. I was always fascinated by what made people believe so strongly when I didn't seem to believe at all. Talking about that theme, the power of belief, fueled the second half of Vampire game design."

Vampire was notably new in many respects. It was conceived as a dark, moody, urban fantasy game with a unique gothic feel that harkened back to TSR's Ravenloft. It would also be the first of a series of linked games sharing the same game world. Its simple cover photo of a rose on green marble set the tone for the game and differentiated it from other games on the market. Its content was also novel, as the game focused on plots, intrigue, and story as opposed to more straightforward dungeon scenarios. While the RPG industry in general had been trending towards a more narrative approach, Vampire was one of the first games of its kind to center on these things.

The vampires were given an extensive list of broad supernatural powers called disciplines, which included superior strength, speed, and toughness, as well as other powers such as mystic senses, mind control, and blood magic. The 13 clans added late in the development process provided a much-needed character class-like system based on vampiric archetypes. This system proved very popular with players.

For the game's mechanical elements, Rein-Hagen turned to Tom Dowd, co-designer of Shadowrun (1989). Vampires system of "comparative" dice pools drew on the mechanics innovated by Shadowrun, changing only the type of dice rolled from six-sided to ten-sided. Skill values that determined the number of dice rolled had been used in games like Champions, but rather than add the result of the dice in total, Vampire compared the result of the dice with a fixed value to determine the degree of success or failure. Skill levels were relatively low, ranging usually from one to five, and were represented with dots rather than numbers, which was the standard of its contemporaries. Players could easily figure their dice pool and roll against the assigned difficulty rating. This system was a boon for the narrative style of play that emphasized story over mechanics, as it was easy for new players to quickly grasp, but it often provided unexpected results, such as a highly skilled character being more likely to fumble.

Publication history 

The original 1991 version was superseded by a second edition in 1992 and a revised edition in 1998. The Vampire: The Masquerade game line was discontinued in 2004, at which point it was superseded by Vampire: The Requiem.

In mid-2010, White Wolf switched exclusively to a print-on-demand model via online role playing game store DriveThruRPG, offering the new and classic World of Darkness source books through the DriveThruRPG web site starting with a number of formerly out of print Vampire: The Masquerade books and gradually adding more as they were ready for print. DriveThruRPG and White Wolf indicated that, eventually, all World of Darkness material will be available in this way.

20th Anniversary Edition
On March 17, 2011, White Wolf announced the 20th Anniversary Edition, which was published during the Grand Masquerade event in New Orleans on September 15–17, 2011 and released to the attendees. Customers not attending The Grand Masquerade were offered a limited time preorder option. The 20th Anniversary Edition contains revisions of rules and is a compendium of most information provided in supplemental material in the game's earlier life. The 20th Anniversary Edition officially revived Vampire: The Masquerade as part of White Wolf Publishing's shift to a print on demand business model, and multiple new Masquerade products have been announced. All of White Wolf's tabletop roleplaying games were then published by Onyx Path Publishing, including Vampire through its 20th Anniversary Edition, while all of White Wolf's Mind's Eye Theatre products were published by By Night Studios.

Fifth edition
In 2015, Paradox Interactive purchased White Wolf and all of its intellectual properties from CCP Games, and it was announced that White Wolf would remain a subsidiary of Paradox Interactive. A 5th edition of Vampire: The Masquerade (also known as V5) was then released in early 2018. Development of the new edition was led by game designer Kenneth Hite, and it was distributed by Modiphius Entertainment. After the release of the Anarch sourcebook in November 2018, Paradox Interactive announced it would no longer allow White Wolf to develop the series in-house due to references in the sourcebook to the anti-gay purges in Chechnya and other controversies surrounding White Wolf. In December 2018, Paradox Interactive announced that Modiphius Entertainment would continue the development of the series with final approval by Paradox Interactive.

In November 2020, Paradox Interactive announced that Renegade Game Studios would become the publishing partner for the entire World of Darkness brand and that they would release Vampire: The Masquerade products. The company also announced it would bring IP development back in-house under the World of Darkness team and "placed White Wolf veteran Justin Achilli at the helm of that effort as the World of Darkness Creative Lead." ICv2 reported that it was unclear how this would impact the publishing relationship with Onyx Path Publishing and Modiphius Entertainment.

In 2021, Polygon reported that "since the initial launch of the game, the Core Rulebook and other products have been revised and updated to meet new ethical standards enforced by the team at Paradox." V5 was released on Roll20 in June 2021. In July 2021, Renegade Game Studios released retail "reprinted editions of Vampire: The Masquerade 5th Edition Roleplaying Game core rulebook and sourcebooks." The online toolset World of Darkness Nexus, which supports Vampire: The Masquerade and other games in the series, is planned to be released in 2022, with a rules and lore compendium, character creation and management tools, matchmaking, and video chat functionality. Early access to Vampire: The Masquerade Nexus was launched in June 2022; this launch includes bundles of both physical and digital game products.

Gameplay

Concept
The game uses the cursed, vampiric condition as a backdrop to explore themes of morality, depravity, the human condition (or appreciation of the human condition in its absence), salvation, and personal horror.  The gloomy and exaggerated version of the real world that the vampires inhabit, called the "World of Darkness", forms an already bleak canvas against which the stories and struggles of characters are painted. The themes that the game seeks to address include retaining the character's sense of self, humanity, and sanity, as well as simply keeping from being crushed by the grim opposition of mortal and supernatural antagonists and, more poignantly, surviving the politics, treachery, and often violent ambitions of their own kind.

Game system

Vampire is based on the Storyteller System. In addition to the general Storyteller rules, it uses a number of specific mechanics aimed towards simulating the vampiric existence. A vampire has a blood pool signifying the amount of human blood or vitae currently in their body; this blood can be spent to power abilities and perform supernatural tricks. These tricks simulate many of those portrayed in film, such as turning into animals or mist, sleeping in the ground or having unnatural charisma and powers of hypnotic suggestion.

Close to the central theme of the game is Humanity. Vampires each have Humanity scores, measuring how closely in touch with human nature they are; as Humanity decreases, vampires become more susceptible to the Beast, the feral side of the vampiric soul that is driven entirely by rage, hunger, and hatred of God and humanity. Brutal, immoral actions risk lowering a vampire's Humanity score. If the individual's Humanity drops to zero, the Beast takes over and the vampire is in a state of constant frenzy known as Wassail.

The actions taken during gameplay are expressed using ten-sided dice. The number of dice used correspond to the player's current skill level, often based on two different skills that together represent the player's ability. For example, to land a punch, the character's dexterity and brawl skill are combined. The resulting number is the number of dice rolled to perform the task. It is up to the story teller to set how high a dice roll must be to be considered a success (usually 6 for standard actions).

Vampires in World of Darkness
Vampires in the World of Darkness make use of several familiar tropes of vampires in myth and legend such as immortality and a powerful thirst for blood. They are truly undead as their hearts do not beat, they do not require food or drink, they do not age, their skin is cold and pale, and the only sustenance they require is blood. Despite their undead status, vampires of this world are thinking, feeling beings capable of thought, emotion, and empathy (though this capacity may diminish with age, or through a desensitization caused by immoral actions, referred to as "loss of Humanity"). Other tropes or weaknesses are described as mere legends or superstitions, such as a vampire's victim becoming a vampire simply from a bite. Though they are typically not repulsed by garlic or holy symbols, there is a system of merits and flaws that can affect characters in this way, though they are not animated by some demonic spirit according to in-game lore.

Weaknesses
Sunlight is fearsome and deadly to vampires of this canon, and at most, they can tolerate a few seconds of exposure before perishing. A wooden stake through the heart is not deadly to these creatures but will immobilize them until it is removed. Arguably their biggest weakness is what is known in-game as the Beast. The Beast is a savage, carnal predatory drive within all vampires. The Beast seeks only to satisfy its base urge to survive. Anger, mortal threats, hunger, or bloodlust are some of the things that can cause the Beast to rise. The Beast is capable of taking over the vampire's conscious mind, forcing them into a frenzied state where they take violent, often deeply regrettable, actions that they perhaps otherwise would not. One of the major themes of Vampire is characters' battles to strike a balance between their violent, predatory nature and being morally responsible before their humanity is eroded by this powerful force within themselves. This theme is summed up in the axiom, "A Beast I Am, Lest a Beast I Become."

Vampires may enter a deathlike sleep called torpor. Torpor may be caused by near-fatal injuries or may be entered into voluntarily. In-game, the level of the vampire's humanity determines how long they sleep for. Though they cannot die of old age, vampires in this setting can die. Fire, sunlight, decapitation, supernatural powers, or succumbing to a clan weakness can cause the vampire to reach what is referred to as Final Death—to truly die. Torpor allows the vampire release from their existential pain but it also may make them vulnerable. Vampires in this state, if not well hidden, may have difficulty defending themselves and are vulnerable to destruction by vampire hunters or Diablerie by other vampires.

Vitae
Characters in this world refer to the supernatural blood in their bodies that sustains them as vitae. Vampires gain vitae by drinking blood. In-game, this accumulation of vitae is called a blood pool. This represents the amount of vitae the player has available to expend to fuel supernatural powers, to heal wounds, or to increase their physical strength, agility, or stamina. Characters can replace lost Vitae by drinking more blood.

A vampire's vitae can inspire false feelings of love and foster dependency if drunk by others. This addiction to vampiric blood is called the Blood Bond. The vampire performing the bond is called a Regnant and the one being bound is called a Thrall. In most cases, a victim must drink three times from the same vampire on three separate nights to become bonded. Once bonded, the victim feels something akin to a very twisted sort of love for the vampire and they become the most important person in their life. They also become more susceptible to mind control by that vampire and are willing to do anything, even risk their own life, to aid their regnant. Mortals, animals, and even other vampires and other supernatural creatures may be bound. The Sabbat practice a different form of group blood bonding by incorporating ancient Tzimisce Blood Magic called the Vaulderie that inspires loyalty and sodality among the sect. It will also instantly break conventional blood bonds if performed correctly by a trained vampire, typically a Pack Priest. They can also be negated by extended amounts of time depending on how far the Bond has gone (steps one, two or three), willpower and the extended absence of the regnant in order to do so.

The Embrace
Vampires may create more of themselves by draining a human to the point of death and then feeding the victim some of their blood. The creator vampire is known as a sire, the newly created vampire a childe and the creation process is referred to as the embrace. Very little vitae is required to trigger the metamorphosis but the victim must be freshly dead. It does not work on corpses that are more than a few minutes old.

A vampire's relative power is limited by something called their Generation, which is set at the time of their embrace. Generation is the vampire's distance from the race's mythical founder, Cain, who is alleged to be the first vampire. For example, a ninth generation is nine generations from Cain. Should this ninth generation vampire embrace someone their progeny would be a tenth generation regardless of how many times they do this. Generation is largely a fixed trait but characters can lower their generation by committing diablerie—the consumption of the soul of a vampire of lower generation. Attitudes towards diablerie range from criminalization to an act of liberation. Regardless, diablerie is a serious act not to be taken lightly.

Motivations and more surrounding the embrace differ from clan and sect. In some sects, such as the Camarilla, the creation of new vampires is tightly controlled. Among the Sabbat or the Anarchs the norms are much looser. Individual clans, especially the Independent Clans, have different norms, rituals and restrictions surrounding the creation of new vampires. Some only embrace a certain ethnic group, such as the Romani with the Ravnos or within certain mortal families as with the Giovanni. Others simply look for certain qualities such as the ability to survive, use intelligence, curiosity or artistic talent. Some create other vampires for power, others for companionship and some are created as fodder for the endless, ancient conflicts, known as the Jyhad, that are central to gameplay.

Myths and origins
Vampires in the World of Darkness believe that their race originates from the Biblical figure of Cain. Cain was said to have been cursed by God with a vampiric state for murdering his brother. The vampires of this canon believe themselves to be descended from this Biblical progenitor.

It is said that Cain was able to pass on his cursed state to others, thereby, making them like himself only somewhat weaker. These first childer, known as the second generation, were said to have been made to keep him company, and they in turn made the third generation. The third were supposedly numbered thirteen and are the semi-legendary founders of the thirteen original clans. According to in-game legend, all of these vampires lived in peace under Cain's rule in the legendary city known as Enoch, or the First City. When God caused the Great Flood, however, the city was destroyed and Cain disappeared, leaving his Children to fend for themselves. The third generation eventually rose up and slew their sires. Cain, upon discovering this, cursed them. Cain's curse is supposedly the reason each clan now has its own weakness. These myths are collected in an in-game document of dubious reliability known as the Book of Nod. Those who study the mythical vampire origins are called Noddists. According to Noddist mythology there are claims that Cain will return at the end of time to judge his descendants: the Antediluvians and all vampires descended from them. This event is known as Gehenna, the end of all vampiric races. Others claim that Gehenna is simply the wakening of the Antediluvians who have returned to feed on the blood of their descendants.

Differing interpretations of the myths divide vampire society. The Sabbat, for example, take the myths quite literally and believe that it is their purpose to defend vampires from the depredations of the ancients. The Camarilla is more dismissive, either claiming that Cain is nothing more than a myth or metaphor or outright suppressing the myths and their study. Contentions between the different societies surrounding the origins of vampires and Gehenna are important in-game motivations for the Jyhad that color the character's understanding of their world. Regardless as to whether or not the myths are true in the context of the game the myth of Cain represents important themes presented in the metaplot such as sins of the father coming back upon his children, the threat of apocalypse, questions of faith, conspiracies, and war of ages.

Golconda is a fabled state of enlightenment that offers vampires a release from their struggle with the Beast. Different editions have gone into different level of detail as to what Golconda is but all agree that it is an elusive and mysterious state and there is very little information in-game or out as to how to achieve it.

The Masquerade
In Vampire: The Masquerade, the Masquerade refers to an organized conspiracy primarily orchestrated by the Camarilla to convince the general public that vampires do not exist. The Camarilla believes the Masquerade is the cornerstone survival strategy for Kindred and fear that without it the kine would rise up and exterminate all the undead.

Prohibitions against exposing the existence of Kindred existed prior to the 15th century in a set of ancient laws known as the Traditions. The First Tradition reads:

"Thou shall not reveal thy true nature to those not of the Blood. Doing such shall renounce thy claims of Blood."

This stricture was not consistently nor as strictly enforced until the Inquisition of the 15th century required it. During this period vampires were destroyed in large numbers by vampire hunters which largely prompted the formation of a sect known as the Camarilla whose primary purpose was to promote and enforce the Masquerade as a means of survival.

The Masquerade is largely enforced through self-policing, but it is primarily the job of the Prince in Camarilla controlled cities to enforce it. Princes may use any means at their disposal to ensure vampire society stays hidden and that those who break the Masquerade are duly punished. Punishments for breaches have a range but are usually draconian in nature due to the seriousness of the Masquerade. Final Death, often by means of a ritualized "Blood Hunt" by other vampires, is not uncommon. When breaches do occur, the Camarilla takes great pains to repair them. This could include anything from erasing a mortal's memories using supernatural powers to manipulating mortal pawns in order to keep events out of the media.

The Masquerade is one of the main in-game points of contention between the two major factions of vampires in the World of Darkness. While many vampires see the pragmatism in the Masquerade some do not agree with it. For example, the Sabbat do not uphold the Tradition that justifies the enforcement of the Masquerade but behind closed doors even they take some steps to contain breaches.

In-game around the early 2000s, after the intelligence agencies of the world discovered the SchreckNET's existence, they in response formed what is known as the Second Inquisition. Utilizing the knowledge of the Society of St. Leopold, which had been canonized under the Vatican, they killed hundreds of thousands of vampires the world over. In reaction, this forced a secondary level of masquerade measures in the game world. Vampires now use everything from burner phones and disposable email, to use of carrier pigeon and information dead drops, sometimes using hypnotized or ghouled humans to pass information. The Camarilla Sect have also become more of a closed off society, only accepting notable kindred, leaving most recently embraced to be slaughtered or adopted by the Anarch Sect, who have adopted tenets of the Camarilla's masquerade to protect themselves.

Society

Vampires in the World of Darkness have a rich, complex, and diverse secret society with a range of ideologies, goals, and backgrounds. Sects largely divide along ideological disputes surrounding the distribution of power among vampires, the role of vampires in the human world, and the ancient myths that allegedly explain the origins and purpose of vampires.

Age
An important means of social distinction among vampires in this setting is through age. Younger vampires wanting respect and power must prove themselves to their elders. While ambition can provide a degree of upward mobility among immortals, oftentimes respect comes to those who can prove they can survive. Characters are loosely divided into several age groups. Ages are not titles or jobs but rather loose descriptions to describe a vampire's development and the social expectations that come with aging.

 Fledgling: Newly Embraced vampires who have yet to formally enter vampire society. Fledglings are still too ignorant and weak to survive on their own (though some among the Sabbat manage it) and are dependent on their Sires for protection and education.
 Neonates: Though still young, a neonate has proved that they can survive on their own and is seen as a full-fledged member of their society.
 Ancilla: Ancilla have survived a few decades or perhaps a few centuries. They have also likely accomplished something in their time for their sect or clan though what this might be varies.
 Elder: A relative term that could indicate a vampire is anywhere between 200 and 1,000 years old. They generally have a great deal of wealth, influence, or power to leverage in the Jyhad.
 Methuselah: Methuselah range between 1,000 and 2,000 years old. At this age, vampires begin to retreat from society and many do not survive the profound changes brought on by surviving this long.
 Antediluvian: Antediluvians are believed to be those vampires of the Third Generation who are descended from Cain's original children. There are rumored to be only thirteen of them.

Clans and sects
Vampires organize and divide themselves politically and ideologically into sects which form a governing structure for undead societies. Laws and norms concerning the place of vampires within the mortal world, feeding, the treatment of vessels, vampiric morality, secrecy, feeding grounds, Gehenna and the distribution of power form the basis of these divisions. The two major sects are the Camarilla and the Sabbat, but there are other sects as well, such as the Inconnu or the Anarchs. A sect is something a character may choose in-game, though this decision is often chosen for them by their Sire. Defection to one side or the other is possible, but comes with a great risk, as much of what motivates the Jyhad are the ideological differences between the Camarilla and the Sabbat.

Sects
Vampire: The Masquerade offers the players the opportunity to play in a politically diverse world in which sects rule over all of vampire society. While many factions and sub-sects exist in the game, the main focus is the conflict between the Camarilla, the Sabbat and the Anarchs.

 The Camarilla: Nicknamed the "Ivory Tower", the Camarilla strictly adheres to a set of ancient laws known as the Traditions. The Camarilla was created as a reaction to the Inquisition and sees its purpose as maintaining the Masquerade as a means of ensuring the survival of all Kindred. The Traditions are enforced and order in each jurisdiction (usually one city in the mortal world) is maintained by a powerful leader known as a Prince. It is the Prince's duty to interpret the Traditions and act as judge, jury, and executioner. The Camarilla describes itself in idealistic terms suggesting it is a genteel society of undead peers but harbors a vast, complex, and rigid hierarchy that breeds ancient rivalries and vicious political machinations. The Camarilla actively denies or suppresses myths about Gehenna and the race's legendary ancient founders. Camarilla vampires refer to themselves (and all other vampires) as "Kindred" as a means of reminding themselves of their origins in humanity. Camarilla vampires often refer to humans as "Kine", an archaic term for cattle. 
 The Anarch Movement: Ostensibly a faction within the Camarilla, the Anarch Movement are decentralized groups of vampires spread out across the world who question what they see as the Camarilla's outmoded means of governing. It contains a diverse range of ideologies but they believe in a more equitable redistribution of power between Kindred.
 The Sabbat: Nicknamed the "Sword of Cain", the Sabbat was formed during the Anarch Revolt in response to the oppressive rule of the Elder vampires. The Sabbat do not openly follow the Traditions but instead adhere to a system of self-rule, freedom, and interdependence as outlined in the Code of Milan. The Sabbat actively believe that Gehenna is real and it is their duty to protect Cainites from the predation of the Antediluvians. The Sabbat believe themselves superior to humans and ultimately believe that they should rule over the human world rather than hide from it. Many have a flagrant disregard for human life which is evinced in the brutal tactics they use in the Jyhad. While anyone may ostensibly claim membership in the Camarilla, the Sabbat have brutal initiation rites where characters must prove their loyalty. They also practice cult-like rituals and a form of ceremonial group Blood Bonding, called Vaulderie, to ensure loyalty. The Sabbat scorn the idea of vampires being Kindred, referring to themselves as Cainites and emphasizing their origins in the blood of Cain. They often use more vulgar epithets for their human vessels.
 The Inconnu: A mysterious sect of elders rumored to have achieved or are in pursuit of Golconda; a sort of redemptive transcendence for the Damned. The most visible sign of the sect are its Monitors who sometimes take up residence in a territory.
 Tal'Mahe'Ra: Otherwise known as the "True Black Hand", the Tal'Mahe'Ra is a strange and insular sect with its base of operations deep in the Shadowlands. Its motivations and purpose are unknown and most know very little about it. 
 The Independents: The Independent Clans operate outside of the Camarilla or the Sabbat. Many of them function like small-scale Sects, such as the Followers of Set or the Giovanni, with specific agendas in mind. Others, such as the Ravnos are more individualistic. The Assamites lie between these extremes, having a centralized hierarchy in the Middle East, but generally operating as freelance mercenaries. These are the only four proper Clans to be regarded as independent (prior to the game's third edition, in which Clan Gangrel formally left the Camarilla), but "Antitribu" splinters of other clans may become independent agencies, as may the more minor "Bloodlines" which do not hold full Clan status.

A vampire who rejects all associations with any sect and clan is known as "Autarkis". The Laibon, called Kindred of the Ebony Kingdom by Western Kindred, are not so much a sect as a cultural group bound together loosely by a powerful spiritual bond to the land and the people of Africa. The Kindred of the East, while sharing some superficial similarity to the western Kindred, are actually an entirely different variety of supernatural being.

Clans
A clan is the character's vampire family. All members of a clan allegedly descend from the clan's Antediluvian founder. It is widely accepted that there are thirteen clans with thirteen founders, though not all of them are technically Antediluvian. Some clan founders, such as Giovanni or Tremere, usurped their position via Diablerie. Clans may have a social or political component to them, but a clan is not something a character chooses; it is something they are Embraced into. Those without a clan are known as Caitiff, and are considered outsiders.

The 13 Clans
Vampire: The Masquerade introduces the use of 13 clans (or major bloodlines) in the game. Each accepted clan can trace its origins to one of 13 elder vampires known as an Antediluvian, for they survived God's biblical flood. Each Antediluvian is a “grandchilde” of Cain, who killed Abel and was cursed by God and His archangels into becoming the first vampire. Through the back story of the game, Antediluvians started a war among themselves, called the Jyhad, and use their clansmen to fight this war for them.

Each Clan and Bloodline has a unique set of powers called Disciplines, and their own set of weaknesses, also unique to that particular branch of vampire.
 
 Banu Haqim: Formerly known as Assamite before the 5th edition, they are a cult of undead assassins based in the Middle East. They kill for hire and are paid in Vitae for use in special rituals that bring the clan's members closer to Haqim. They possess a specialized Discipline called Quietus, which aids in stealth and killing. In the ancient past, the Tremere placed a curse on the entire clan in order to curb their rampant Diablerie. As a result, the clan could not consume Vitae without suffering terrible wounds and is unable to benefit from Diablerie. (This curse was broken in the game's third edition, and the "Antitribu" faction in the Sabbat was never affected by it; un-cursed Assamites are instead highly susceptible to "blood addiction", and may be driven to compulsively attack other vampires for their Vitae). Assamites are largely independent of sects.  After joining the Camarilla they officially were recognized as Banu Haqim "Child of Haqim" as it came to light the previous name was a disparagement in their culture. 
 Brujah: In ancient times, the Brujah were a clan of noble philosophers and warrior-poets. Since the loss of their city of Carthage, which was their crowning achievement, they have become a clan of malcontents, rebels, rogues, and anti-authoritarians. Brujah possess great passion, but this same passion makes it more difficult for them to resist the Beast. Brujah are one of the seven founding clans of the Camarilla. After the revolt of Theo Bell, who killed Hardestadt in Prague, they left in numbers to join the Anarch movement and are commonly leaders.
 Gangrel: A clan of animalistic shape-shifters who shun the cities for the wilderness beyond. Independent and more interested in their own survival, the Gangrel prefer to run with wild animals rather than play politics with others of their kind. Gangrel are masters of the Discipline Protean which allows them to change their bodies into bestial shapes. When Gangrel frenzy, they resemble the Beast, taking on animal features and disfigurements. Gangrel are one of the seven founding clans of the Camarilla, although their leadership broke from it close to the end of the 1990s in universe. Now more associated with the Anarch Sect or act as Independents with a few staying loyal to the Camarilla.
 Hecata: Formerly known as Giovanni before the 5th edition, they originated from a wealthy Venetian merchant family of necromancers whose patriarch, Augustus Giovanni, was embraced into clan Cappodocian. Giovanni exterminated the parent clan, Diablerized its founder, and founded a new clan, but in doing so gained the enmity of the larger Kindred community. Branded "Devil Kindred", the Giovanni made peace with the rest of the clans by swearing to remain neutral in the Jyhad. The Giovanni are tight-knit and highly organized, and they embrace only within certain mortal families. The Giovanni are primarily interested in wealth and necromancy, but these are simply a means to an end. The clan's founder wishes to remove the barrier between the living world and the dead in order to reign supreme. The clan's weakness is that their bite (which in other vampires is normally pleasurable to the victim) causes excruciating pain. The Giovanni are independent. After the siege of the Second Inquisition & other factors, the clan is considered near extinct with exception of ancient strongholds. Faced with the growing pressures of Second Inquisition, the disappearance of Augustus Giovanni, along with the release of the wraiths under his control, and the fear of the Promise of 1528 expiring soon, the Giovanni clan along with the remnants of the Cappadocian clan and various other necromantic bloodlines such as the Nagaraja and the Samedi, merged in an event formally known as the Family Reunion and formed Clan Hecata. Like the Giovanni and the Cappadocian clans before, the Hecata are focused on necromancy and actively remain independent of the Jyhad.
 Lasombra: Darkly aristocratic vampires, Lasombra see power over others and self-mastery as their noblesse oblige. As one of the two founding clans of the Sabbat, they gained notoriety for allegedly destroying their Antediluvian founder. The Lasombra practice a Discipline known as Obtenebration that allows them to manipulate shadows and darkness. Perhaps as a result of their signature Discipline they do not appear in mirrors or on film that uses mirrors in its development. Leadership of Lasombra have officially joined The Camarilla in 5th Edition's version of Chicago By Night.
 Malkavian: Malkavian are a clan of lunatics whose madness grants them strange insights. Their Discipline of Dementation allows them to spread their insanity like a plague (prior to the third edition, knowledge of this Discipline was suppressed within the Camarilla). All members of this clan are insane in some way. They are one of the seven founding clans of the Camarilla.
 The Ministry, formerly known as the Followers of Set: Originally, a clan of cultists who worship their Antediluvian progenitor, the Egyptian god Set. They are masters of secret and forbidden lore and foster corruption and desperation in the world as part of their worship of their god. Their signature Discipline was Serpentis which allows them to take on aspects of snakes. Setites are especially sensitive to light and take twice as much damage from sunlight as other Kindred. Followers of Set independent of the sects consider themselves a sect unto themselves. Under the rebrand of the Ministry they've allied themselves with the Anarchs, with this rebrand they've seemingly tempered their views and occultist ideals for a more self religion where Set exist inside each of his followers.
 Nosferatu: The clan Nosferatu are doomed to wear their bestial nature on the outside. The Embrace turns its victims into hideous and deformed monsters who are marginalized by their appearance and forced to dwell in the shadows of the sewers. However, their lives on the fringes and their stealthy abilities allow them to learn secrets others would rather keep hidden; as a result, they often traffic in information. All Nosferatu are ugly and obviously monsters to the point that appearing openly would break the Masquerade. They are one of the founding members of the Camarilla.
 Ravnos: The clan Ravnos are reputed as outcasts, troublesome thieves, and charlatans. While some among them follow Indian spiritual beliefs concerning cycles of incarnation, others are simple opportunists taking advantage of whatever chaos can be had. Ravnos rarely embrace those not of Eastern European Romani backgrounds. They practice a special Discipline known as Chimestry which allows them to create illusions. All Ravnos indulge in a particular vice as their clan weakness. The Ravnos are independent.After the siege of the Second Inquisition & other factors, the clan is considered near extinct with exception of ancient strongholds. 
 Toreador: Toreador are sensitive, artistic, and sometimes debauched hedonists fascinated by the mortal world and its artistic creations. Enthralled by the ever-changing mortal world, they are one of the few clans who seek to keep up with it. Toreador often Embrace for beauty or to preserve artistic talent. Beauty can utterly captivate them, immobilizing them for a period of time. They are one of the founding seven clans of the Camarilla.
 Tremere: Tremere are a clan of blood sorcerers and mages originally belonging to the Order of Hermes. The Tremere gained their immortal status by experimenting with Tzimisce Vitae. Their ambitious founder Diablerized the Antediluvian of the former clan Salubri, solidifying the Tremere's status as a clan. Their Discipline of Thaumaturgy allows them to use the power of their blood to cast spells, but their dependency on Vitae makes them more easily susceptible to Blood Bonds. The clan is highly organized, and its members are all partially Blood Bound to the ruling seven Elders of the clan. They are one of the founding seven clans of the Camarilla. After the Chantry in Vienna was destroyed in 2008, cutting off the 'head' of the Pyramid the clan fractured into Four houses: One still calling itself House Tremere, under the Camarilla with leadership of Karl Schrekt upholding tradition, House Goratrix resurged sticking to stringent recruitment but not much else is known, House Carna who takes on all seeking membership, also seeking to modernizing & the newly formed House Ipsissimus, which is fully Anarch aligned focusing on the spirituality of their condition over the structure.
 Tzimisce: Otherworldly and scholarly, the Tzimisce ruled over their lands in Eastern Europe for centuries. Like the Lasombra, the Tzimisce also claim to have destroyed their founder and are pillars of the Sabbat. Alien but mystical, the Tzimisce use their unique flesh and bone shaping Discipline of Vicissitude to transform themselves into superior beings. The Tzimisce are deeply tied to the lands where they were Embraced. If they do not rest within proximity of at least two handfuls of the land where they were born or Embraced, they become increasingly debilitated. In 5th edition, they're said to be one of the only two remaining clans in the Sabbat, but are left alone when Lasombra join the Camarilla. 
 Ventrue: The Ventrue are the aristocrats and kings of vampires, having historically played a leadership role among the clans. Ventrue seeks power and wealth to support its legacy of rulership over Kindred and Kine. Ventrue, as a clan, may only feed from a specific kind of vessel (e.g. virgins, blondes, youngest siblings) which the player selects using character creation.

Antitribu
Most Sabbat vampires consider themselves to be the “anti-Clans” or antitribu in rebellion against their parent clans' values, goals, or loyalties. For example, Toreador within the Sabbat consider themselves Toreador antitribu. Some rebel or twist the expectations of their clans, while others take a more radical view of their lineage's core ideas. Some are so different that they are considered different bloodlines manifesting different Disciplines, weaknesses or even a different name. The Lasombra and Tzimisce do not consider themselves antitribu as most of their members are within the Sabbat. Lasombra outside the Sabbat are considered antitribu while the Tzimisce outside the Sabbat are referred to as Old Clan. A Sabbat offshoot of the Followers of Set is known as the Serpents of the Light, and have rejected both the clan founder and his Egyptian origin, in favor of the cultural trappings of Caribbean voodoo.

Bloodlines
Bloodlines, on the other hand, either cannot trace their lineage to an Antediluvian founder or are too little in number to be considered a major player in the Jyhad. Some Bloodlines are considered to be offshoots of existing clans. All bloodlines are treated as exceptionally rare in the game, leaving most of the interactions and story lines centered around the clans.

 Baali: An obscure and malevolent bloodline of demon-worshiping vampires legendarily descended from Baal-the-Destroyer. Baali practice a dark Discipline called Daimoinon which allows them to summon the powers of hell, learn dark secrets, or exploit other's weaknesses. Baali are repulsed by holy symbols. If the Baali join a sect at all, they do so under false pretenses. Their true loyalties are to their infernal master.  
 Blood Brothers: Members of the Sabbat. Artificially created as shock troops, they are born in groups of seemingly identical "twins" or "triplets" et cetera, and have the power to share wounds, appendages and even disciplines with other members of the same group.
 Daughters of Cacophony: A mysterious mix of Malkavian, Toreador, and Ventrue, who all claim parentage for the bloodline, the Daughters of Cacophony are devoted to singing of all kinds. They practice a special discipline called Melpominee which allows them to enhance their voices to increase their beauty, or even cause madness or wounds. Daughters exist in small numbers in both sects or as independents.
 Gargoyles: Created by the Tremere from other Kindred during their early nights to defend them from their enemies the Gargoyle bloodline is exactly what the name entails: stone-skinned, demonic-looking, winged monsters who are designed to haunt the exterior of castles. Some remain enslaved by Tremere magic but others have freed themselves and joined the Camarilla. Besides being hideous, Gargoyles easily fall prey to supernatural mind control.
 Harbingers of Skulls: Rumored to be an ancient bloodline freshly awakened from torpor, the Harbingers of Skulls are necromancers loyal only to the Sabbat. They resemble rotting corpses similar to the Samedi. Some believe that they are the long lost remains of the Cappadocians. As of 5th edition, they are now a bloodline of Clan Hecata.
 Kiasyd: The calm and studious, fey-touched Kiasyd descend from the clan Lasombra. They are a rare bloodline ostensibly loyal to the Sabbat but more interested in their scholarship than the Jyhad. Iron inflicts terrible wounds on them and may even cause them to frenzy.
 Laibon: Originally presented as a single Bloodline of African vampires, which were later expanded into a multi-clan society with their own hardcover sourcebook.
 Lamia: A particularly obscure Bloodline, thought extinct. The Lamiae are confirmed to be active in fifth edition as a bloodline of Clan Hecata.
 Lhiannon: Celtic vampires with powers of druidic witchcraft. Thought extinct.
 Nagaraja: Members of the True Black Hand. Asiatic vampires who eat flesh as well as drink blood. As of fifth edition, the Nagaraja is now a bloodline of Clan Hecata.
 Old Clan Tzimisce: Members of the True Black Hand. The Tzimisce clan as they were prior to joining the Sabbat and being "infected" by the Vissicitude discipline. The legendary Dracula is likely a member of the Old Clan, and others of the Bloodline share similar characteristics - a background in Slavic aristocracy, a deep tie to the lands of Carpathia, and so forth.
 Salubri: The Salubri were one of the thirteen original clans until their founder, Saulot, was diablerized by Tremere. Since then the bloodline has been nearly hunted to extinction by the hands of their usurpers. Far from the reputation of their evil diablerists the former clan practices a Discipline known as Obeah which has the power to heal bodies and minds. The bloodline intentionally keeps itself small with only seven in existence at any given time. The entire bloodline is devoted to finding Golconda. Salubri cannot feed from unwilling victims. All of this is untrue of the Sabbat branch of the Salubri, who are as "evil" as the original Salubri are "good", practicing compulsive warfare and using their "Valeren" discipline, a perversion and reversal of Obeah, to literally steal human souls. Due to a mix of Tremere propaganda and encounters with the Antitribu faction, Salubri in general are feared and reviled by nearly all vampires, which keeps them on the fringes of vampire society.
 Samedi: A loathsome necromantic bloodline arising from the Caribbean, being embraced by the Samedi literally causes the victim to appear as a walking corpse. One of the few vampires as horrendous as the Nosferatu, the Samedi practice necromancy and a special Discipline called Thanatosis which they use to weaken or cause death in others. Samedi exist in small numbers in both sects or as independents. As of fifth edition, is now a bloodline of Clan Hecata.
 True Brujah: Members of the True Black Hand. Ostensibly the original Brujah clan, whose Antediluvian was displaced by a renegade offspring of their founder. Virtually the exact opposite of "false" Brujah, the bloodline's members are coldly unemotional, but possess the ability to manipulate the flow of time.

Reception
In the November 1991 edition of Dragon (Issue 175), Allen Varney did not like unprofessional production values of the gamebook, pointing to "amateurish" artwork and poor copy-editing. Varney also found the rules remarkably lacking in detail. However, he applauded the wide-ranging campaign advice. "There are whole chapters on how to plot stories, maintain suspense, handle players, and so on." He concluded, "If you're up for a potent and even passionate role-playing experience, look for this game."

In a 1996 reader poll by Arcane magazine to determine the 50 most popular roleplaying games of all time, Vampire: The Masquerade was ranked 6th.  Editor Paul Pettengale commented: "Vampire has always proved the most popular of the World of Darkness games, a testament both to the continuing appeal of the vampire itself, and to the structure and design of the game. Like all of the Storyteller range, it's not an easy game to get right, and it relies heavily on both the players and the referee putting a lot of effort and imagination into their roles. With a good group,  though, it can be an immensely interesting and thought-provoking game, and one of the most effective horror RPGs around. Despite its tendency to take itself a little seriously, Vampire: The Masquerade has a great deal to offer the more mature and serious gamer."

In 1991, Vampire: The Masquerade was one of the top ten best selling tabletop role-playing games of the year in the United States.

Awards
 In 1992, Vampire: The Masquerade won the Origins Award for Best Roleplaying Rules of 1991.
 In 1993, the second edition of Vampire: The Masquerade won Casus Belli awards for the best role-playing game of 1992, and for the best French translation of a role-playing game of 1992
 In 2007, the game was inducted into the Origins Awards Hall of Fame.
In 2019, the 5th edition of Vampire: The Masquerade won the Origins Award for Best Roleplaying Game of the Year and won the Origins Fan Favorite Award. It is the "second RPG to win Best-Roleplaying Game twice".
In 2023, interactive novel Vampire: The Masquerade – Sins of the Sires by Natalia Theodoridou was nominated for the Nebula Award for Best Game Writing.

Reviews
 Shadis #9
 Shadis #29
Dragão Brasil #1 (1994) (Portuguese)
Dosdediez (Número 7 - Feb/Mar 1995)

Tie-ins and adaptations

RPG adaptions and spinoffs
 Steve Jackson Games published an adaptation of Vampire: The Masquerade using their popular GURPS generic table-top roleplaying system. They followed this book up with a supplement called  GURPS: Vampire Companion. Both books were produced for use with the Third Edition of the GURPS rules and are no longer in print. The Steve Jackson company also produced GURPS conversions of Werewolf: The Apocalypse, and Mage: The Ascension. Steve Jackson Games had the original copyright to the World of Darkness setting.  Initially, SJ Games decided not to release their version; however, after the massive popularity the game setting received during the White Wolf Company's release, SJ Games, which still held their official rights of release on the system, published its version. 
 Werewolf: The Apocalypse, Mage: The Ascension, Wraith: The Oblivion, Changeling: The Dreaming, Hunter: The Reckoning, Mummy: The Resurrection, Kindred of the East, and Demon: The Fallen are other RPG titles set in the Old World of Darkness, a setting which Vampire: The Masquerade first established.
 Vampire: The Requiem is a spiritual successor to the game, introduced when the original game was ended in 2004. Although it is an entirely new game, it uses many elements of the old game, including many clan and discipline names and an modified version of the Storyteller rules system called Storytelling system. At the White Wolf Camarilla meeting in October 2009 it was decided to re-support the Storyteller games both in the official Camarilla fan club and outside to Table Top players.
Under the title Mind's Eye Theatre: The Masquerade White Wolf also provided a live action role-playing game in the same setting, using their Mind's Eye Theatre system.

Non-roleplaying tabletop games
Vampire: The Eternal Struggle (first published 1994), formerly known as Jyhad, a traditional collectible card game based on Vampire, was produced by Wizards of the Coast and later by White Wolf. It is currently produced by Black Chantry, a company founded solely for this purpose, under license by Paradox Interactive, who now own the White Wolf brand, by republishing old cards and making minor balancing adjustments to the rules or card texts, with a fifth edition scheduled for October 2020. The relaunch by Black Chantry changes the mode of distribution by scrapping booster packs in favor of non-randomized precompiled card sets.

In 2020, Paradox licensed the setting to several game production companies, leading to multiple Kickstarter campaigns.

 Vampire: The Masquerade – Rivals, a re-interpretation of The Eternal Struggle, changing and simplifying some of the rules. It is produced by Renegade Game Studios and is marketed as an 'expandable card game', rather than traditional trading card game, with the initial release being a box including decks for four players as well as one set of 'city' cards, which are used by all players equally. This moves the game closer to a traditional board game where 'the game' (in this case the city cards) is required to play, as opposed to a traditional TCG, where any two players owning a deck can duel each other.
 Vampire: The Masquerade – Heritage, a legacy board game in which players control a clan vying over control for a span of 600 years.
 Vampire: The Masquerade – Chapters, a board game using miniatures which follows a story campaign, trying to emulate the experience of an RPG campaign without the need for a Storyteller (i.e. game master).
 Vampire: The Masquerade – Vendetta, a card based strategy game about controlling territories of Chicago.
 Vampire: The Masquerade – Blood Feud, a board game for up to 32 players which requires a Storyteller.
 Vampire: The Masquerade – Prince's Gambit, a card based game in which part of the players form a hostile faction whose membership is unknown, similar to the Werewolf or Mafia party games.

Video games

 Vampire: The Masquerade – Redemption, a video game based upon the Vampire milieu, developed by Nihilistic Software and published in 2000 by Activision.
 Vampire: The Masquerade – Bloodlines. Developed by Troika Games and published by Activision in 2004, it uses Valve's Source engine. A sequel, Bloodlines 2, is in development as of 2022.
 Vampire: The Masquerade – Coteries of New York is a video game by Draw Distance, released in 2019 for Windows PC, and 2020 for other platforms. A sequel, Shadows of New York, was released in 2020.
 Vampire: The Masquerade, a line of interactive fiction titles developed by Choice of Games from 2020 to 2022.
 Vampire: The Masquerade – Swansong is a role-playing video game in development by Big Bad Wolf, released in 2022 for Microsoft Windows, Nintendo Switch, PlayStation 4, PlayStation 5, Xbox One, and Xbox Series X/S.
 Vampire: The Masquerade – Bloodhunt, a video game is a free-to-play battle royale game developed and published by Swedish developer Sharkmob. It was published on April 27, 2022.

Novels and comics 

Moonstone Books published a series of comic book adaptations of Vampire: The Masquerade beginning in 2001 which are now hard to find, but some of them made it into DriveThruRPG's Print on Demand service.
There have been multiple novels published, the most extensive one being the so-called 'Clan Novels', which came in a current time and a medieval series.
 Vampire: The Masquerade is an ongoing horror comic book published by Vault Comics since 2020.
World of Darkness: Crimson Thaw (2021) is a limited series comic published by Vault Comics. It contains game "material for the fifth edition of the Vampire: The Masquerade tabletop [...] allowing gamers to actually play the events of the series in their own games". It also merges lore with Werewolf: The Apocalypse.

Television, web series and other media
 Kindred: The Embraced, a 1996 television series based on Vampire, was produced by Aaron Spelling.
 A compilation album, called Music from the Succubus Club, was released by Dancing Ferret Discs to serve as a soundtrack for the Vampire RPG.
L.A. by Night is an actual play web series using the Fifth Edition of Vampire, led by Jason Carl as the storyteller, which premiered in September 2018. The cast includes regular members B. Dave Walters, Cynthia Marie, Alexander Ward, Erika Ishii, Xander Jeanneret, and Josephine McAdam. The first 3 seasons were distributed by Geek & Sundry, but the fourth season onwards was hosted on World of Darkness' channels.
Seattle by Night is an actual play web series using the Fifth Edition of Vampire, led by Jason Carl as the storyteller, which premiered in November 2019. The cast includes regular members Mike Krahulik, Dora Litterell, Jasmine Bhullar, and Jerry Holkins. The first season was distributed by Penny Arcade. "The show starts right after the protagonist coterie gets back to Seattle from Montreal, where they were involved in an incident that everyone would rather forget. The Second Inquisition is one of the principal antagonists of the show".
Vein Pursuit is an actual play web series using the Fifth Edition of Vampire, which premiered in January 2020. Karim Muammar acts as storyteller and the show features various Paradox Interactive and Hardsuit Labs employees who play as a group of "incompetent Anarch envoys trying to drive from L.A. to Seattle to back up a courier". The events of the show precede the video game Bloodlines 2; the first season was distributed on the official World of Darkness' channels.
NY by Night is an actual play web series using the Fifth Edition of Vampire, led by Jason Carl as the storyteller, which is scheduled to premiere in July 2022; it acts as a sequel to L.A. by Night. Before the premiere, World of Darkness announced the planned structure of the first three seasons. The first season will focus on four Anarch members, played by Alexander Ward, Mayanna Beren, Aabria Iyengar, Joey Rassool, who chafe under the Camarilla's rules. Season two will focus on an unannounced cast of Camarilla Kindred maintaining their power in the city. Season three will bring these parallel storylines together as the two coteries collide.

Citations

General references 
 Justin Achilli, Clanbook: Cappadocian, White Wolf Game Studio, 1997, 
 Justin Achilli et al., Guide to the Sabbat, White Wolf Game Studio, 1999, 
 Justin Achilli, Clanbook: Giovanni by White Wolf Game Studio) (1997) 
 Justin Achilli et al., Kindred of the Ebony Kingdom, White Wolf Game Studio, 2003, 
 Achilli, Justin. Vampire: The Masquerade Revised Edition. White Wolf Game Studio, 1998. .
 Steven C. Brown & Jeff Starling, The Players Guide to the Sabbat, White Wolf Game Studio, 1995, 
 Steven C. Brown & Ken Meyer, The Storytellers Handbook to the Sabbat, White Wolf Game Studio, 1995, 
 Andrew Greenberg, Vampire Players Guide, White Wolf Game Studio, 1993, 
 Robert Hatch et al., A World of Darkness (Second Edition), White Wolf Game Studio, 1996, 
 James A. Moore et al., Blood Magic: Secrets of Thaumaturgy, White Wolf Game Studio, 2000, 
 Dean Shomshak & Ari Marmell, Blood Sacrifice: The Thaumaturgy Companion, (White Wolf Game Studio, 2002, 
 Sven Skoog & Lucien Soulban, Clanbook: Baali, White Wolf Game Studio, 1998, 
 Lucien Soulban & James Stewart et al., Clanbook: Tzimisce, White Wolf Game Studio, 2001, 
 White Wolf Publishing, Children of the Night, White Wolf Game Studio, 1999, 
 White Wolf Publishing et al., Vampire Storytellers Handbook, White Wolf Game Studio, 2000, 
 White Wolf Games Studio et al., Vampire Storytellers Companion White Wolf Game Studio, 1998, 
 www.white-wolf.com

Further reading

External links
 

Vampire: The Masquerade
Origins Award winners
Role-playing games introduced in 1991